A media resource locator (MRL) is a URI used to uniquely identify and locate a multimedia resource.  It is used by  the VideoLAN and Xine media players, as well as the Java Media Framework (JMF) API.

VLC, for example, supports the following MRLs:
 dvd://[][@][@[][,[][,]]]
 vcd://[][@{E|P|E|T|S}[]]
 http://[:]/[]
 rtsp://[:]/

Several media players also support Video4Linux as v4l:// and v4l2://.

References

Media players